The Silence of Dr. Evans is a 1973 Soviet sci-fi film directed by Budimir Metalnikov.

Plot 
One plane crashes over the Atlantic, but several passengers survived, including the famous scientist Martin Evens, working to extend the life of a person. He becomes the chosen one of the aliens who came into contact with earthlings.

Cast 
 Sergey Bondarchuk as Dr. Martin Evans
 Zhanna Bolotova as Orante
 Irina Skobtseva as Mrs. Evelin Evans
 Leonid Obolensky as Zor
 Ivan Kuznetsov as Rin  
 Boris Romanov as Buami  
 Olgert Kroders as Grass  
 Gunars Placens as Bem  
 Pranas Piaulokas as Latski  
 Valeri Khlevinsky as Fazenda

References

External links 
 

1973 films
1970s Russian-language films
Soviet science fiction films
Films scored by Eduard Artemyev
Mosfilm films
Films about extraterrestrial life